Samuel Sewall (December 11, 1757  – June 8, 1814) was an American lawyer and congressman. He was born in Boston in the Province of Massachusetts Bay.

Biography 
After attending Dummer Charity School (now The Governor's Academy), Sewall graduated from Harvard College (A.B. 1776, A.M. 1779, honorary LL.D. 1808) and set up practice as a lawyer in Marblehead. He served as a member of the state legislature in 1783, and from 1788-96.

He represented Massachusetts in the U.S. House of Representatives from 1796 to 1800, and from 1800 to 1814 served as a judge of the Massachusetts Supreme Judicial Court, becoming chief justice in 1814. He died at Wiscasset in Massachusetts' District of Maine while holding a court there. He was elected a Fellow of the American Academy of Arts and Sciences in 1801.

American novelist Louisa May Alcott was Sewall's great niece. His younger sister, Dorothy, was Alcott's great-grandmother. In 1781, he married Abigail Devereux; they had a family of at least six sons and two daughters. Sewall's great-grandfather Samuel Sewall was a judge at the Salem witch trials in colonial Massachusetts, and subsequently Chief Justice of Massachusetts.

Sewall was elected a member of the American Antiquarian Society on June 1, 1814.  Sewall died 7 days later on June 8, apparently before he could formally respond, so his disposition regarding membership is unknown.

In 1814 Fort Sewall in Marblehead, Massachusetts was renamed for him.

References

External links
Biographic sketch at U.S. Congress website

1757 births
1814 deaths
American Congregationalists
Harvard College alumni
Fellows of the American Academy of Arts and Sciences
Members of the Massachusetts House of Representatives
Politicians from Boston
Chief Justices of the Massachusetts Supreme Judicial Court
Federalist Party members of the United States House of Representatives from Massachusetts
Members of the American Antiquarian Society
Sewall family
The Governor's Academy alumni